Combustication Remix EP, also called Combustication Remixes,  is an EP released by Medeski Martin & Wood.  It consists of various artists' remixes of songs from their album Combustication.

Track listing 
 "Hey-Hee-Hi-Ho" (illyB remix) – 3:54
 "Whatever Happened to Gus" (Guru's Word to the Drums mix) – 4:39
 "Start-Stop" (DJ Logic remix) – 6:32
 "Nocturne" (Dan the Automator remix) – 5:41
 "Sugar Craft" (Yuka Honda remix) – 4:10
 "Satan's Church of Hypnotized Logic" (Bill Laswell remix) – 10:04

Credits 
 Mastered by Michael Fossenkemper at Turtle Tone, NYC
 Packager design: ILLYBLEAU
 Art direction: Gordon H. Jee

References 

1999 EPs
1999 remix albums
Remix EPs
Blue Note Records remix albums
Blue Note Records EPs
Medeski Martin & Wood remix albums
Medeski Martin & Wood EPs